CommonGround is a Web app that helps mental health clients identify treatment preferences and effectively communicate them to clinicians. CommonGround Software supports shared-decision making in behavioral health. It brings the voice of the individual to the center of the care team. In this way, the team can focus on "what matters to you" rather than "what's the matter with you?"

People diagnosed with mental health disorders are often faced with complex treatment options. Shared decision making can be useful when medical evidence does not suggest a clearly optimal treatment path. The program makes use of shared decision making to increase the effectiveness and efficiency of consultations, and has led to higher levels of satisfaction among clients.

History

CommonGround was first implemented by Patricia Deegan in 2006 in conjunction with the Kansas Department of Social and Rehabilitation Services.
Providers can license the software for a monthly and yearly fee, which varies according to the number of users.

Awards

 2015 Wayne Fenton Award for Exceptional Clinical Care
 2013 APA Gold Award: Amplifying the Voices of Individuals Who Use Mental Health Services: A Commitment to Shared Decision Making
 2013 Scattergood Foundation Innovation Award
 2013 New York Association of Psychiatric Rehabilitation Services (NYAPRS) Lifetime Achievement Award
 Patient Empowerment by the Ashoka Changemakers Foundation finalist in the international competition
 Agency for Healthcare Research and Quality recognition as a practice innovation

References

External links 

 

Health care software